Dominique Besnehard (born 5 February 1954) is a French actor, film producer, casting director, writer and talent manager. He has appeared in more than 80 films and television shows since 1975. He starred in the 1983 film À nos amours, which was entered into the 34th Berlin International Film Festival.

Filmography

Actor

Producer

References

External links

1954 births
Living people
French male film actors
French male television actors
People from Bois-Colombes
20th-century French male actors
21st-century French male actors